The Yavapai–Apache Nation (Yavapai language: Wipuhk’a’bah  and Western Apache language: Dil’zhe’e) is a federally recognized Native American tribe in Verde Valley, Arizona. Tribal members share two culturally distinct backgrounds and speak two indigenous languages, the Yavapai language and the Western Apache language. The two largest sections,  together –  almost 90 percent of the reservation's territory, are in the town of Camp Verde (Western Apache: Gambúdih). Smaller sections are located in the town of Clarkdale , and the unincorporated community of Lake Montezuma. The total resident population of the reservation was 743 persons as of the 2000 census. The 2010 Census reported 1,615 people on the reservation. Of these, 512 lived in Camp Verde, 218 in Clarkdale, and only 13 in Lake Montezuma.

History
The Yavapai–Apache have lived in the southwest since 1100 C.E. Their use of the land helped them to survive as hunters and gatherers. Chief YumaFrank, Chief Viola Jimulla, and Carlos Montezuma were some of the first leaders of this nation. Beginning in 1865 the Yavapai were moved to several reservations such as: Colorado River Reservation, Fort McDowell, RioVerde, San Carlos, Camp Verde, Middle Verde, Clarkdale, and Prescott.

Communities
 Camp Verde (Western Apache: Gambúdih)
 Clarkdale (Yavapai: Saupkasuiva)
 Lake Montezuma (Rimrock)

Attractions
The Yavapai–Apache Nation operates the Cliff Castle Casino, a popular gaming, recreation, dining and lodging attraction in the Verde Valley.

Education
The reservation is served by the Camp Verde Unified School District.

See also
 Yavapai people
 Apache people
 Dilzhe'e Apache

References

 Yavapai–Apache Nation Reservation, Arizona United States Census Bureau
 Rasmussen, R.E.H American Indian Tribes. Salem Press, 2000.

External links
 Yavapai–Apache Nation, official website
 Yavapai–Apache Nation, Arizona Intertribal Council
 Cliff Castle casino and hotel

Apache tribes
Native American tribes in Arizona
Federally recognized tribes in the United States
Geography of Yavapai County, Arizona
American Indian reservations in Arizona
Western Apache
Yavapai